Legacy... Hymns and Faith is the fourteenth studio album by Christian singer and songwriter Amy Grant. It was her first overtly religious album since Lead Me On in 1988, and consists primarily of well-known hymns with a few original songs. Early pressings of the CD are in "double disc" format containing a music CD and a bonus DVD with a behind the scenes documentary in the studio recording the album. Grant released a follow-up to this album, Rock of Ages... Hymns and Faith in 2005.

Track listing 

 ''Tracks 1–4, 6, 8, 10–11, and 13–14 arranged by Vince Gill and Brown Bannister. Track 12 arranged by Ronn Huff.

 "This Is My Father's World" (public domain) – 3:05
 "My Jesus, I Love Thee" (public domain) – 3:34
 "Softly and Tenderly" (public domain) – 4:03
 "I Need Thee Every Hour"/"Nothing but the Blood" (public domain) – 4:42
 "What You Already Own" (Grant) – 3:21
 "It Is Well with My Soul"/"The River's Gonna Keep On Rolling" (public domain, Gill) – 4:54
 "Do You Remember the Time" (Gill, Grant, Keith Thomas) – 3:51
 "Fields of Plenty"/"Be Still My Soul" (P.D., Bennett) – 4:36
 "Imagine/Sing the Wondrous Love of Jesus" (P.D., Grant, Bart Millard) – 5:17
 "Come, Thou Fount of Every Blessing" (public domain) – 3:15
 "Fairest Lord Jesus" (public domain) – 3:15
 "Holy, Holy, Holy" (public domain) – 2:26
 "What a Friend We Have in Jesus"/"Old Rugged Cross"/"How Great Thou Art" (public domain, Stuart K. Hine) – 3:30
 "Marching to Zion" (public domain) – 3:20

Personnel 
 Amy Grant – lead vocals, harmony vocal (4, 7)
 Tim Akers – Hammond B3 organ (1, 4, 6, 7, 9, 10), accordion (2, 5, 11), synthesizer (3)
 Pete Wasner – acoustic piano (1, 2, 3, 5, 6), synthesizer (11)
 John Jarvis – acoustic piano (4, 7, 10, 11)
 Bernie Herms – acoustic piano (9)
 Michael Omartian – acoustic piano (13)
 Vince Gill – acoustic guitar solo (1), harmony vocal (1, 2, 9), mandolin (2, 5, 6 ,12), electric guitar solo (3, 7, 10), duet vocal (4), electric guitar (4, 9, 13), dobro (5), backing vocals (6, 10), acoustic guitar (11, 14)
 Kenny Greenberg – electric guitar (1–6, 10)
 Biff Watson – acoustic guitar (1, 6)
 Mac McAnally – acoustic guitar (2, 3, 5)
 Tom Britt – electric guitar (4)
 Richard Bennett – acoustic guitar (4, 7, 8, 10, 11), gut-string guitar (12)
 Gordon Kennedy – electric guitar (7), acoustic guitar (11)
 Rivers Rutherford – acoustic guitar (9)
 Leland Sklar – bass (1–7, 10, 11)
 Michael Rhodes – bass (9)
 Chad Cromwell – drums (1–7, 10), floor tom (11)
 Dan Needham – drums (9)
 Eric Darken – additional percussion (11)
 Sam Levine – penny whistle (2), tenor saxophone (4), clarinet (4)
 Jim Horn – tenor saxophone (4), baritone saxophone (4), horn arrangements (4)
 Barry Green – trombone (4)
 Mike Haynes – trumpet (4)
 Jim Hoke – harmonica (7)
 Stuart Duncan – fiddle (2, 8)
 Andrea Zonn – fiddle (11)
 John Catchings – cello (13)
 Carl Marsh – string arrangements and conductor (9)
 The London Session Orchestra – strings (9)
 The Nashville String Machine – strings (12)
 Bekka Bramlett – backing vocals (4)
 Kim Keyes – backing vocals (4, 6)
 Billy Thomas – backing vocals (4, 10)
 Alison Krauss – harmony vocal (11)

Bagpipes and Drums on "Marching to Zion"
 Roy Barber 
 Todd Boswell
 Greg Cutcliff
 Carol Dav
 Jay Dawson

Choir on "Marching to Zion"
 Aerin
 Brown Bannister 
 Michelle Bentrem
 Sterling Bishir 
 Traci Bishir 
 Michael Blanton 
 Beverly Darnall
 John Darnall 
 Teresa Ellis 
 Don Finto 
 Amy Grant 
 Burton Grant 
 Kathy Harrell 
 Chris Harris 
 Jan Harris
 Cindy Hudson
 Leigh Ann Jones 
 Bonnie Keen-King
 Ginger Lang 
 Phyllis Mayfield 
 Carol Nuismer 
 Carol Pigg 
 Gary Pigg
 Jerry Regan 
 Jerry Verner

Production 
 Brown Bannister – producer
 Vince Gill – producer
 Michael Blanton – executive producer
 Steve Bishir – recording, mixing
 Hank Nirider – recording assistant, mix assistant
 Chris Scherbak – recording assistant, mix assistant
 Sang Park – recording assistant, mix assistant
 Greg Fogie – recording assistant, mix assistant
 East Iris Studios (Nashville, Tennessee) – recording location
 The Parlor (Nashville, Tennessee) – recording location, mixing location
 Oceanway Studios (Nashville, Tennessee) – recording location
 Air Lyndhurst (London, England) – recording location for The London Session Orchestra
 Fred Paragano – digital editing
 Doug Sax – mastering
 Robert Hadley – mastering
 The Mastering Lab (Hollywood, California) – mastering location
 Astro May – photoshoot
 Kevin Tucker – cover
 Katherine Petillo – designer
 Susan Browne – packing
 Richard Seagraves – photography
 Kara Irvine – wardrobe, styling
 Lars Nordensten – wardrobe, styling 
 Melanie Shelly – hair
 Shelia Davis – make-up

Charts

Weekly charts

Year-end charts

Certifications and sales

Awards
GMA Dove Awards

References

Amy Grant albums
2002 albums
Albums produced by Brown Bannister
A&M Records albums
Word Records albums